Ryquell Keeman Armstead (born October 30, 1996) is an American football running back for the DC Defenders of the XFL. He played college football at Temple and was drafted by the Jacksonville Jaguars in the fifth round of the 2019 NFL Draft.

Early life and high school career
Armstead was born in Bridgeton, New Jersey, and grew up in Millville, New Jersey. He rushed for 1,488 yards and 18 touchdowns as a senior at Millville Senior High School, including a school-record 337 yards against Absegami High School.

College career
Armstead played four seasons for the Temple Owls. Armstead spent his first two seasons as a backup to starter Jahad Thomas and rushed for 191 yards and two touchdowns as a freshman. He received significantly more playing time as a sophomore and rushed for 919 yards on 156 carries and a team-leading 14 touchdowns as the Owls went on to win the American Athletic Conference (AAC) championship. Armstead struggled with injuries in his first year as a starter, rushing for 604 yards and five touchdowns. As a senior, Armstead rushed for 1,098 yards on 210 carries (5.2 average) and scored 13 touchdowns. He was named first team All-AAC despite nagging injuries. Armstead finished his collegiate career as the Owls' fourth-leading rusher with 2,812 yards and fourth in school history with 34 rushing touchdowns.

College statistics

Professional career

Jacksonville Jaguars
Armstead was drafted by the Jacksonville Jaguars in the fifth round with the 140th overall pick in the 2019 NFL Draft. Armstead signed a rookie contract with the Jaguars on May 9, 2019. Armstead made his NFL debut in the Jaguars season opener on September 8, 2019, gaining seven yards on a single carry in a 40–26 loss to the Kansas City Chiefs.

Armstead scored his first career touchdown, a seven-yard reception (also the first of his career) from Gardner Minshew, on September 29, 2019 against the Denver Broncos. Armstead finished his rookie season with 35 carries for 108 rushing yards and 14 receptions for 144 receiving yards and two receiving touchdowns.

Armstead was placed on the reserve/COVID-19 list by the team on August 2, 2020. He was activated on August 20. He was placed back on the COVID-19 list on September 4, 2020. On October 25, 2020 it was reported that he would miss the rest of the season due to COVID-19 and that he had been hospitalized twice having significant respiratory issues. He was waived after the season on May 17, 2021.

New York Giants
On May 18, 2021, Armstead was claimed off waivers by the New York Giants. He was waived on June 24.

New Orleans Saints
On October 6, 2021, Armstead was signed to the New Orleans Saints practice squad. On October 28, 2021, Armstead was waived by the Saints.

Green Bay Packers
On November 3, 2021, Armstead was signed to the Green Bay Packers practice squad.

Jacksonville Jaguars (second stint)
On December 22, 2021, Armstead was signed to the active roster of the Jacksonville Jaguars. He was waived on August 29, 2022.

DC Defenders 
On November 17, 2022, Armstead was drafted by the DC Defenders of the XFL.

References

External links
 Jacksonville Jaguars bio
 Temple Owls bio

1996 births
Living people
African-American players of American football
American football running backs
DC Defenders players
Green Bay Packers players
Jacksonville Jaguars players
Millville Senior High School alumni
People from Bridgeton, New Jersey
People from Millville, New Jersey
Players of American football from New Jersey
Sportspeople from Cumberland County, New Jersey
New York Giants players
New Orleans Saints players
21st-century African-American sportspeople